Gounon is a surname. Notable people with the surname include:

 Jacques Gounon (born 1953), French senior civil servant and business manager
 Jean-Marc Gounon (born 1963), French racing driver
 Jules Gounon (born 1994), French racing driver

French-language surnames